Margaret Harriman is a Paralympic athlete from South Africa. She was born in Great Britain.

She was the only lady to compete in the netball tournament of the second Stoke Mandeville Games in 1949 under her maiden name of Margaret Webb. From 1960 to 1976 she competed in the Summer Paralympics in many sports, including archery, athletics, dartchery, lawn bowls and swimming. She represented Rhodesia in her first two Paralympics and then South Africa since 1968, winning eleven gold medals.

Between 1960 and 1968 she won an impressive eight gold medals in archery.

In 1976 she became ineligible to compete after South Africa was banned from the games because of its policy on apartheid.

She made a long-awaited return to the competition at the 1996 Summer Paralympics in Lawn Bowls after the fall of apartheid which led to the lifting of the ban on South African competitors. In this edition she won her 17th and last medal, a bronze.

References

Paralympic gold medalists for Rhodesia
Archers at the 1960 Summer Paralympics
Archers at the 1964 Summer Paralympics
Archers at the 1968 Summer Paralympics
Archers at the 1972 Summer Paralympics
Archers at the 1976 Summer Paralympics
Athletes (track and field) at the 1968 Summer Paralympics
Athletes (track and field) at the 1972 Summer Paralympics
Athletes (track and field) at the 1976 Summer Paralympics
Dartchers at the 1968 Summer Paralympics
Dartchers at the 1976 Summer Paralympics
Lawn bowls players at the 1972 Summer Paralympics
Lawn bowls players at the 1976 Summer Paralympics
Lawn bowls players at the 1996 Summer Paralympics
Swimmers at the 1960 Summer Paralympics
Paralympic gold medalists for South Africa
Living people
South African female archers
Rhodesian female archers
Year of birth missing (living people)
Medalists at the 1960 Summer Paralympics
Medalists at the 1964 Summer Paralympics
Medalists at the 1968 Summer Paralympics
Medalists at the 1972 Summer Paralympics
Medalists at the 1976 Summer Paralympics
Medalists at the 1996 Summer Paralympics
Paralympic medalists in archery
Paralympic medalists in lawn bowls
Paralympic medalists in swimming
Paralympic medalists in dartchery
Paralympic swimmers of Rhodesia
Dartchers at the 1964 Summer Paralympics